Dominique André is a Paralympic athlete from France competing mainly in category T44 sprint events.

Dominique has competed at two Paralympics, in 2000 and in 2004. On both occasions he has competed in the individual 100 metres and 200 metres races, but it has been for his part in the French relay teams that he has won his medals. He has two silver medals from his participation in the 4 × 100 metres relay teams and two bronze medals from the 4 × 400 metres relay teams.

References

External links 
 

Paralympic athletes of France
Athletes (track and field) at the 2000 Summer Paralympics
Athletes (track and field) at the 2004 Summer Paralympics
Paralympic silver medalists for France
Paralympic bronze medalists for France
French male sprinters
Living people
Medalists at the 2000 Summer Paralympics
Medalists at the 2004 Summer Paralympics
Year of birth missing (living people)
Paralympic medalists in athletics (track and field)
20th-century French people
21st-century French people
Sprinters with limb difference
Paralympic sprinters